San Francesco Saverio is the Italian name of St Francis Xavier. It can refer to:

 Church of San Francesco Saverio, Foggia
 Church of San Francesco Saverio, Mondovì
 Church of San Francesco Saverio, Palermo
 Church of San Francesco Saverio, Rimini
 Church of San Francesco Saverio, Sansepolcro
 Church of San Francesco Saverio, Trento
 Church of San Francesco Saverio alla Garbatella, Rome